Necronomicon: The Dawning of Darkness, also known as Necronomicon: The Gateway to Beyond, is a 2000 video game developed by Wanadoo Edition and released for Windows and the PlayStation video game console.

Plot 
The game is set in 1927, where the ordinary life of William H. Stanton is affected by matters of the occult and darker truths about our world.

The game starts off in William Stanton's home in Providence, Rhode Island, where he is startled by a knock at his door. As William opens the door he discovers that it is his close friend Edgar acting in a suspicious manner. He gives William a metallic pyramid and tells him not to give it to anyone, including him, especially if he asks for it. After going back inside there is a knock at the door again. This time it's Dr. Egleton, a friend of Edgar's father. He asks William to visit Edgar at his home soon so he can help decide whether or not Edgar should be committed for insanity.

The game then picks up and the player has to solve a series of puzzles and question shady people to find out what is going on, and uncover the truth about the horrible fate that has befallen Edgar.

Gameplay 
The game has 30 hours of play, 4 difficulty levels, 20 3D-modeled characters, a dozen Game Overs, and original music.

Critical reception

References

External links 
 Necronomicon: The Dawning of Darkness at Microïds

2000 video games
Adventure games
Cryo Interactive games
Cthulhu Mythos video games
DreamCatcher Interactive games
Fiction set in 1927
Horror video games
Microïds games
PlayStation (console) games
Video games developed in France
Video games set in the 1920s
Windows games